is a former Japanese football player.

Career
Teppei Uesugi joined S.League club Albirex Niigata Singapore in 2004. In 2007, he backed to Japan and joined Tokushima Vortis reserve team. In 2008, he moved to Thespa Kusatsu. In 2009, he moved to Fujieda MYFC. In 2011, he retired.

References

1985 births
Living people
Hannan University alumni
Association football people from Hyōgo Prefecture
Japanese footballers
J2 League players
Thespakusatsu Gunma players
Fujieda MYFC players
Association football goalkeepers